The 2005 All-Pacific-10 Conference football team consists of American football players chosen by various organizations for All-Pacific-10 Conference teams for the 2005 college football season. The USC Trojans won the conference, posting an undefeated 8–0 conference record (though this was later vacated).. USC then lost to the Texas Longhorns in the Rose Bowl BCS National Championship Game 41 to 38. USC running back Reggie Bush was voted Pac-10 Offensive Player of the Year. Oregon defensive tackle Haloti Ngata and Arizona State linebacker Dale Robinson were voted Pat Tillman Pac-10 Co-Defensive Players of the Year.

Offensive selections

Quarterbacks
Matt Leinart, USC (Coaches-1)
Drew Olson, UCLA (Coaches-2)

Running backs
Reggie Bush, USC (Coaches-1)
Jerome Harrison, Washington St. (Coaches-1)
LenDale White, USC (Coaches-2)
Maurice Drew, UCLA (Coaches-2)

Wide receivers
Mike Hass, Oregon St. (Coaches-1)
Derek Hagan, Arizona St. (Coaches-1)
Dwayne Jarrett, USC (Coaches-1)
Jason Hill, Washington St. (Coaches-2)
Demetrius Williams, Oregon (Coaches-2)

Tight ends
Marcedes Lewis, UCLA (Coaches-1)
Troy Bienemann, Washington St. (Coaches-2)

Tackles
Sam Baker, USC (Coaches-1)
Ryan O'Callaghan, California (Coaches-1)

Guards
Marvin Philip, California (Coaches-1)
Taitusi Lutui, USC (Coaches-1)
Grayling Love, Arizona St. (Coaches-2)
Fred Matua, USC (Coaches-2)
Aaron Merz, California (Coaches-2)

Centers
Ryan Kalil, USC (Coaches-1)
Enoka Lucas, Oregon (Coaches-2)
Nick Mihlhauser, Washington St. (Coaches-2)

Defensive selections

Ends

Frostee Rucker, USC (Coaches-1)
Lawrence Jackson, USC (Coaches-1)
Mkristo Bruce, Washington St. (Coaches-2)
Nu'u Tafisi, California (Coaches-2)
Copeland Bryan, Arizona (Coaches-2)

Tackles
Haloti Ngata, Oregon (Coaches-1)
Brandon Mebane, California (Coaches-1)
Sir Henry Anderson, Oregon St. (Coaches-2)

Linebackers
Dale Robinson, Arizona St. (Coaches-1)
Keith Ellison, Oregon St. (Coaches-1)
Trent Bray, Oregon St. (Coaches-1)
Anthony Trucks, Oregon (Coaches-2)
Desmond Bishop, California (Coaches-2)
Joe Lobendahn, Washington (Coaches-2)
Spencer Havner, UCLA (Coaches-2)

Cornerbacks
Just Phinisee, Oregon (Coaches-1)
Dante Hughes, California (Coaches-1)
Aaron Gipson, Oregon (Coaches-2)
Antoine Cason, Arizona (Coaches-2)

Safeties
Darnell Bing, USC (Coaches-1)
Darrell Brooks, Arizona (Coaches-1)
Scott Ware, USC (Coaches-2)
J. D. Nelson, Oregon (Coaches-2)
Donnie McCleskey, California (Coaches-2)

Special teams

Placekickers
Alexis Serna, Oregon St. (Coaches-1)
Justin Medlock, UCLA (Coaches-2)

Punters
Sam Paulescu, Oregon St. (Coaches-1)
Danny Baugher, Arizona (Coaches-2)

Return specialists 
Terry Richardson, Arizona St. (Coaches-1)
Maurice Drew, UCLA (Coaches-1)
T. J. Rushing, Stanford (Coaches-2)
Reggie Bush, USC (Coaches-2)

Special teams player
Tim Wusu, Stanford (Coaches-1)
Derrick Doggett, Oregon St. (Coaches-2)
Byron Storer, California (Coaches-2)

Key
Coaches = selected by Pac-12 coaches

# = unanimous selection by coaches

See also
2005 College Football All-America Team

References

All-Pacific-10 Conference Football Team
All-Pac-12 Conference football teams